Chidam is a small town in the South Sikkim district of the Indian state of Sikkim.

Geography
It has an average elevation of 819 metres (2,687 feet).

References

Cities and towns in Namchi district